Andrew McIntosh (also known as Andy McIntosh) Emeritus Professor of Thermodynamics and Combustion theory at the University of Leeds. He is also the director of the organisation Truth in Science which promotes creationism and intelligent design.

His research-group has received the outstanding contribution to innovation and technology award from the Times Higher Education awards in London in 2010 for developing a technology based on the defence mechanism of bombardier-beetle.

Creationism 
In a 2007 discussion with Richard Dawkins on BBC Radio Ulster, McIntosh argued that the principles of thermodynamics are not consistent with Darwinian evolution.

In November 2006, the University of Leeds issued a statement distancing itself from creationism, and described McIntosh's directorship of Truth in Science as being unconnected with his teaching or research.

Publications 
 Origins: Examining the Evidence (Truth in Science, 2011) 
 The Delusion of Evolution (New Life Publishing Co, 2010) 
 Genesis for Today: Showing the Relevance of the Creation/Evolution Debate to Today's Society (foreword by Ken Ham) (Day One Publications, 2000)

References

External links 
 

Living people
Alumni of the University of Wales
Alumni of Cranfield University
Academics of the University of Leeds
Christian Young Earth creationists
Year of birth missing (living people)